Danny K. Kaleopa (born May 3, 1966) is a former Samoan rugby union player. He played as a flanker. He played for Auckland, Nippon Steel, and Waitakere City. He also played for the Hawaii Harlequins from Hawai'i.

Career 

His debut with Western Samoa was during a test match against Korea at Tokyo, on April 8, 1990. He was part of the 1991 Rugby World Cup roster. His last international appearance was in a test match against Fiji at Apia, on June 5, 1993.
In 1993, he played for the Samoa national team at the first ever Rugby World Cup Sevens, taking part in a series of test matches on March 28, 1993, when the teams of New Zealand (24-14) and Fiji (14-12) were defeated, and in the game against the New Zealanders, he scored several tries.

After career
In 2011, after Samoa's disastrous performance at the World Cup in New Zealand, Kaleopa supported team captain Mahonri Schwalger, who called for reforms in the Samoa Rugby Union and to understand the reasons for the Samoan failures. The reason for Schwalger's indignation was the scandalous behavior of the national team manager Mathew Vaea, who was fired from the national team for drunkenness and neglection of duty at the World Cup. 

His daughter is the New Zealand swimmer Gabrielle Fa'amausili.

References

External links 

 
 Danny K. Kaleopa at New Zealand Rugby History

1966 births
Living people
Rugby union flankers
Samoa international rugby union players
Samoan expatriate sportspeople in Japan
Samoan expatriate sportspeople in New Zealand
Samoan rugby union players
Samoan expatriate rugby union players
Expatriate rugby union players in Japan
Expatriate rugby union players in New Zealand
Canterbury rugby union players
Auckland rugby union players
Kamaishi Seawaves players